In Praise of Folly, also translated as The Praise of Folly ( or ), is an essay written in Latin in 1509 by Desiderius Erasmus of Rotterdam and first printed in June 1511. Inspired by previous works of the Italian humanist  De Triumpho Stultitiae, it is a satirical attack on superstitions, various traditions of European society, and on the Latin Church.

Erasmus revised and extended his work, which was originally written in the space of a week while sojourning with Sir Thomas More at More's house in Bucklersbury in the City of London. The title Moriae Encomium had a punning second meaning as In Praise of More (In Greek moría translates into folly".  In Praise of Folly is considered one of the most notable works of the Renaissance and played an important role in the beginnings of the Protestant Reformation.

Content
In Praise of Folly begins with a satirical learned encomium, in which Folly praises herself, in the manner of the Greek satirist Lucian (2nd century AD), whose work Erasmus and Sir Thomas More had recently translated into Latin; it then takes a darker tone in a series of orations, as Folly praises self-deception and madness and moves to a satirical examination of pious but superstitious abuses of Catholic doctrine and corrupt practices in parts of the Roman Catholic Church—to which Erasmus was ever faithful—and the folly of pedants. Erasmus had recently returned disappointed from Rome, where he had turned down offers of advancement in the curia, and Folly increasingly takes on Erasmus' own chastising voice. The essay ends with a straightforward statement of Christian ideal: "No Man is wise at all Times, or is without his blind Side."

Erasmus was a good friend of More, with whom he shared a taste for dry humor and other intellectual pursuits. The title Moriae Encomium could also be read as meaning "In praise of More". The double or triple meanings go on throughout the text.

The essay is filled with classical allusions delivered in a style typical of the learned humanists of the Renaissance. Folly parades as a goddess, offspring of Plutus, the god of wealth and a nymph, Youth. She was nursed by two other nymphs, Inebriation and Ignorance. Her faithful companions include Philautia (self-love), Kolakia (flattery), Lethe (forgetfulness), Misoponia (laziness), Hedone (pleasure), Anoia (dementia), Tryphe (wantonness), and two gods, Komos (intemperance) and Nigretos Hypnos (heavy sleep). Folly praises herself endlessly, arguing that life would be dull and distasteful without her. Of earthly existence, Folly pompously states, "you'll find nothing frolic or fortunate that it owes not to me."

Reception
Moriae Encomium was hugely popular, to Erasmus' astonishment and sometimes his dismay. Even Erasmus' close friends had been initially skeptical and warned him of possible dangers to himself from thus attacking the established religion. Even Pope Leo X and Cardinal Cisneros are said to have found it amusing. Before Erasmus' death it had already passed into numerous editions and had been translated into Czech, French, and German. An English edition soon followed. It influenced the teaching of rhetoric during the later sixteenth century, and the art of adoxography or praise of worthless subjects became a popular exercise in Elizabethan grammar schools. A copy of the Basel edition of 1515/16 was illustrated with pen and ink drawings by Hans Holbein the Younger. These are the most famous illustrations of In Praise of Folly.

Its role in the beginnings of the Protestant Reformation stems from its criticism of the practices of the Church and its political allies.

Notes

External links

 Praise of Folly, and Letter to Maarten Van Dorp, 1515. Translated by Betty Radice. Introduction and notes by A.H.T. Levi. Penguin, 1994.
 The Praise of Folly. Translated from the Latin, with an Essay & Commentary, by Hoyt Hopewell Hudson.With a new foreword by Anthony Grafton. Princeton Classics, 1969.
The Praise of Folly, translated by John Wilson in 1668, at Project Gutenberg
Praise of Folly at Internet Archive (multiple translations)
In Praise of Folly, with portrait, life of Erasmus, and his Epistle to Sir Thomas More. Translator not stated. 1922.
The Praise of Folly, English audiobook recording at LibriVox. The Wilson translation.
In Praise of Folly from Christian Classics Ethereal Library. The Wilson translation.

1511 books
Books by Desiderius Erasmus
Philosophy books
Renaissance literature
Medieval philosophical literature
16th-century Latin books
Dutch satire